The Chrüz is a mountain in the Rätikon range of the Alps, located west of St. Antönien in the canton of Graubünden.

References

External links
 Chrüz on Hikr

Mountains of the Alps
Mountains of Switzerland
Mountains of Graubünden
Two-thousanders of Switzerland
Luzein